Lovro Mihić (born 25 August 1994) is a Croatian handball player who plays for Wisła Płock and the Croatian national team.

He participated at the 2017 World Men's Handball Championship.

References

1994 births
Living people
Handball players from Zagreb
Croatian male handball players
Expatriate handball players in Poland
Croatian expatriate sportspeople in Poland
RK Zagreb players
Wisła Płock (handball) players
21st-century Croatian people